Christopher Todd Feinstein (May 26, 1967 – December 15, 2009) was an American bass guitarist, record producer, and songwriter from Nashville, Tennessee. Feinstein's career began at the age of 15, recording and touring in bands (Shadow 15, The Questionnaires, Bedlam, Iodine), which led him to widen his studio skills where he became interested in production and recording artist development.

In 1997, Feinstein moved to New York City to pursue his career in production. He became a partner in a production team based at the infamous TMF Studios in the East Village. While at TMF, he teamed up with Detroit native, producer/engineer Michael Tudor to co-produce a series of recordings of New York rock bands such as The Astrojet (featuring Jody Porter of Fountains of Wayne), Clara Venus and Mikki James. Together, Feinstein and Tudor co-produced material for the Beatles-based soundtrack to the 2001 drama film I Am Sam, featuring Rufus Wainright and Sean Lennon's "Across the Universe" and Howie Day's "Help!". They also co-produced Moby's singles "South Side" (featuring Gwen Stefani) and We Are All Made of Stars. During this time, Feinstein also contributed musically to several artists' albums such as Fat Joe's Loyalty, Chantal Kreviazuk's Juno Award-winning Color Moving and Still, Tim Finn's Say It Is So and Patty Griffin's Flaming Red.

In 2006, Feinstein was sought-after to play bass guitar for Ryan Adams & The Cardinals. During this time he also became known as Space Wolf. As a Cardinal he recorded three albums, Easy Tiger (2007), Follow the Lights EP (2007) and  Cardinology (2008) and toured extensively worldwide through 2009.

The last album he recorded playing bass guitar was New Zealand artist Gin Wigmore's Holy Smoke produced by Mike Elizondo and engineered by Joe Chiccarelli.

Growing up, Feinstein enjoyed listening to The Clash, Hüsker Dü, The Replacements, David Bowie, The Rolling Stones, The Who and Brian Wilson.

Death
On December 15, 2009, Feinstein was found dead in his New York City apartment. He was 42 years old. Feinstein's death was ruled an accident by the coroner, stemming from prior health issues and adverse reaction to over-the-counter cough medicine

Discography

References

1967 births
2009 deaths
21st-century American guitarists
Accidental deaths in New York (state)
Jewish American musicians
The Cardinals (rock band) members
Musicians from Nashville, Tennessee
Record producers from Tennessee
Songwriters from Tennessee
20th-century American bass guitarists
20th-century American Jews
21st-century American Jews